Peripheral nerve field refers to an area of skin innervated by a single nerve. A peripheral nerve field can also be described as cutaneous nerve distribution.

An area innervated by a single dorsal root is called a dermatome.

Neurologists rely on maps of dermatomes and peripheral nerve fields to diagnose areas of nerve damage based on somasthetic or proprioceptive deficits in specific dermatomes and peripheral nerve fields. Although areas of innervation are somewhat consistent following genetically determined patterns of the species,  specific areas of innervation are as unique to an individual as are fingerprints.

See also
 Nervous system

somatosensory system